Issa Bery  (also Issa Beri and Issabéry) is a commune of the Cercle of Goundam in the Tombouctou Region of Mali. The administrative center (chef-lieu) is the village of Toucabangou which is on the south shore of Lake Faguibine. The commune includes areas of land both to the south and to the north of the lake.

References

External links
.

Communes of Tombouctou Region